The Meiatermes is an extinct genus of termites that belonged to the Hodotermitidae. Their fossils have been obtained from early Cretaceous deposits in Brazil and Spain.

References

Termite genera
Cretaceous insects